The Soim was the parliament of the short-lived Republic of Carpatho-Ukraine. The assembly had its seat in Khust.

Background
The establishment of a Soim, an autonomous parliament for the Ruthenian region, had been stipulated in the 11th article of the 1919 Treaty of Saint-Germain-en-Laye. But the establishment of the autonomous parliament was delayed for many years.

Election
After years of delays, election to the Soim was held on 12 February 1939 on the basis of the passing of legislation by the Czechoslovak parliament providing further autonomy for Carpatho-Ukraine on 22 November 1938. 32 members of the Soim were elected from a single constituency. The Ukrainian National Union (UNO) presented a unity list for the vote. According to results published, 244,922 out of 265,002 votes cast (92%) went in favour of the unity list.

Out of the 32 members elected there were 29 Ukrainians, 1 Czech, 1 German and 1 Romanian. The German deputy was Anton Ernst Oldofredi, leader of the German People's Council (Deutsche VolksRat, DVR).

The elected candidates were

Session
The Soim met once on 15 March 1939. The inaugural session had been scheduled for 2 March 1939 but the Czecho-Slovak president Emil Hácha opted not to convene the assembly. In response to the Slovak declaration of independence on 14 March 1939, the regional government of Avgustyn Voloshyn called for an independent Carpatho-Ukrainian state under the protection of the German Reich.

Whilst the session was in progress the time Hungarian troops were on the offensive in Carpatho-Ukraine and Czecho-Slovak forces were retreating westward. Augustin Stefan served as the speaker of the assembly. Stefan Roscha served as the vice speaker of the assembly.

The assembly, with 22 members present, declared the independence of the Republic of Carpatho-Ukraine. The session ratified the constitution of the Republic of Carpatho-Ukraine, with Ukrainian as the official language and a presidential form of governance. The Soim elected Voloshyn as President of the Republic. Yulian Revay was named Prime Minister.

Khust was attacked by Hungarian forces on the same day as the session was held. Carpatho-Ukraine was annexed by Hungary the following day, ending the brief existence of the Republic of Carpatho-Ukraine.

Tragedy of Carpatho-Ukraine
The Soim session is depicted in the 1940 movie Tragedy of Carpatho-Ukraine, produced by Vasyl Avramenko.

References

Carpatho-Ukraine
Defunct national legislatures
Law of Ukraine
1939
Elections in Carpatho-Ukraine
1939 in Ukraine